"Pull Me Under" is the debut single by Dream Theater from their 1992 album Images and Words. It is also featured on the Live at the Marquee CD, Once in a LIVEtime CD, Live at Budokan CD and DVD, the Images and Words: Live in Tokyo VHS and DVD, and the Live at Luna Park DVD. It received positive critical reception and extensive MTV rotation. It is widely considered to be Dream Theater's signature song.

Overview

During development, the song held the working title "Oliver's Twist". In a radio interview, Mike Portnoy stated that "...it was just an 8 and a half minute song, and it was just a fluke for MTV and radio play to happen."

The song's abrupt ending was modified in their Greatest Hits compilation. When asked about the abrupt ending while at a drum clinic in Atlanta in 1999, Mike Portnoy explained "We had all this tension, and it just kept building and building, and we had no idea where to take it, you know? So we decided to just pull the plug on it, like The Beatles did with 'She's So Heavy'."

The song was released as a promotional single and as a music video. Based on a shortened version of the song at 4:48 in length, the video alternates between clips of the band performing and an obscure storyline. The band members were reportedly unhappy with the storyline, saying that it doesn't have anything to do with the song's subject matter.

Because it was the only Dream Theater single to achieve such success, "Pull Me Under" is the "hit" referred to in the Dream Theater compilation Dream Theater's Greatest Hit (...and 21 Other Pretty Cool Songs).

Lyrics
Lyricist Kevin Moore refers to Shakespeare's Hamlet, as told from Prince Hamlet's point of view. The lyrics allude heavily to the play, echoing Hamlet's desire to give in to his urge to gain revenge for his father at the cost of his own sanity. Over the final moments of the song, James LaBrie can be heard singing the song's only direct quote from the play: "O, that this too, too solid flesh would melt".  Therein, Prince Hamlet is pleading for escape from his mortal trappings.

Track listing

Personnel
 James LaBrie – background vocals, lead vocals
 Kevin Moore – keyboards
 John Myung – bass
 John Petrucci – guitars
 Mike Portnoy – drums, percussion

Credits 
 David Prater – production

Charts

Releases 
 CD single, promo – Atco Records PRCD 4624-2, US 1992
 Vinyl, 12", 45 RPM single, promo – Rock Ahead SAM 1030, UK 1992
 CD single, promo – Atco Records PRCD 4724-2, US 1992
 CD single, promo – Atco Records PRCD 4928, US 1992

References

1992 songs
1992 debut singles
Dream Theater songs
Atco Records singles